Lake Rerewhakaaitu is a small, shallow lake in northern New Zealand, located 30 kilometres to the east of Rotorua. It is immediately south of the active volcano Mount Tarawera, and the geography was substantially altered by a major eruption in 1886. 

Occupying a shallow basin, it is mostly surrounded by farming pasture; although over the past few decades, exotic and indigenous forest cover has begun to appear. The lake is classified as mesotrophic, with moderate productivity and water quality.

The lake is feed by the Awaroa and Mangakino Streams. The lake has no permanent outflow. However, when the lake is high, water flows down the Mangaharakeke Stream. It is believed that the springs at the head of Te Kauae Stream are sourced from the lake and that groundwater may also flow southeast of the lake into the Rangitaiki River catchment. 

The shores of the lake are often the scene of dog shows, like those from Rotorua, Agility during Easter, and the obedience show in January.

Education

References 

Rotorua Lakes District
Rerewhakaaitu, Lake
Populated places in the Bay of Plenty Region